Mike Ezuruonye (born 21 September 1982), is a Nigerian actor.

Early life and career
Mike is from Uzuakoli in Abia State, Nigeria. He was born on 21 September 1981 in Lagos. He attended the Federal Government College, Wukari, Taraba and Archbishop Aggey Memorial school, Lagos before studying Accounting at Nnamdi Azikiwe University, Awka, Anambra State, Nigeria. He worked as a banker prior to becoming an actor.
He has featured in several Nollywood movies. He was nominated for Best Actor in a Leading Role for his performance in the movie "The Assassin"  at the Africa Movie Academy Awards in  2009. and a nomination for Best Actor in Africa Magic Viewers Choice Awards.

Personal life
He was married to Nkechi Nnorom and has a son named Reynold Nkembuchim Ezuruonye. He has a younger sister, Chichi, who is a physician in the United Kingdom.

Selected filmography
 Endless Passion (2005)
 Broken Marriage
 Beyond Reason
 Critical Decision
 Unforeseen (2005)
 Occultic Kingdom
 Desire (2008)
 Ropes of Fate (2010)
 Keep Me Alive (2008)
 Unforgivable (2014)
 Calabash Part 1 & Part 2 (2014)
 The Duplex (2015)

References

External links 
 

Igbo male actors
Nigerian male film actors
Living people
21st-century Nigerian male actors
Nnamdi Azikiwe University alumni
Male actors from Lagos
1982 births
Nigerian male television actors
Actors from Abia State
Nigerian film producers
Nigerian film directors
Nigerian media personalities
Nigerian television personalities